Hydryphantes is a genus of mites belonging to the family Hydryphantidae.

The genus has cosmopolitan distribution.

Species:
 Hydryphantes abnormis Koenike, 1908
 Hydryphantes acutus

References

Trombidiformes
Trombidiformes genera